Slavko Duščak (born January 2, 1974) is a Slovenian professional basketball coach and former player.

Professional career
Duščak played for Slovan, Olimpija, Pivovarna Laško, Krka, Teramo Basket, Elektra Esotech, Anwil Włocławek, Soproni KC and Koper.

National team career
Duščak was a member of the Slovenia national basketball team. Over 29 appearances he scored 140 points. He competed at Eurobasket 2003.

Personal life 
His son Dan (born 2002) is a professional basketball player for Cedevita Olimpija.

References

External links 
 Eurobasket.com Profile 
 Fiba Profile 

1974 births
Living people
ABA League players
KK Krka players
KK Olimpija players
KK Zlatorog Laško players
KK Włocławek players
Soproni KC players
Shooting guards
Slovenian basketball coaches
Slovenian men's basketball players